Samarium iodide may refer to:

 samarium(II) iodide (samarium diiodide), SmI2
 samarium(III) iodide (samarium triiodide), SmI3